Juraj Zatko (born 5 June 1987) is a Slovak male volleyball player. He is part of the Slovakia men's national volleyball team.  He competed at the 2009 Men's European Volleyball Championship. On club level he plays for VK Bystrina SPU Nitra.

References

External links
Profile at FIVB.org

1987 births
Living people
Slovak men's volleyball players
Sportspeople from Bratislava
Volleyball players at the 2015 European Games
European Games competitors for Slovakia
Slovak expatriate sportspeople in the Czech Republic
Slovak expatriate sportspeople in Poland
Expatriate volleyball players in the Czech Republic
Expatriate volleyball players in Poland
AZS Olsztyn players